The 1991 North Bedfordshire Borough Council election took place on 2 May 1991 to elect members of North Bedfordshire Borough Council in England. This was on the same day as  other local elections.

Prior to the election, two councillors quit the Conservative group to sit as Independents.

Summary

Election result

Ward results

Brickhill

Bromham

Castle

Cauldwell

Clapham

De Parys

Goldington

Great Barford

Harpur

Kempston East

Kempston Rural

Kempston West

Kingsbrook

Putnoe

Queens Park

Sharnbrook

Wootton

References

Bedford
Bedford Borough Council elections
1990s in Bedfordshire